Elizabeth Chang is an electrical engineer at Curtin University in Perth, Australia. Chang was named a Fellow of the Institute of Electrical and Electronics Engineers (IEEE) in 2015 for her contributions to industrial informatics and cyber physical systems. She holds a PhD in Computer Science and Software Engineering from La Trobe University.

Elizabeth concentrates in biomedical engineering, and she has also gone to law school. During her time at law school, she was an extern for U.S. District Court James V. Selna, who is an American judge. At Curtin University, she also had Institute of Excellence for Digital Ecosystems and Business Intelligence Institute.

Elizabeth Chang has also co-authored 2 books, and has published more than 300 scientific papers as book chapters in journals. Her previous academic achievements also include 20 Competitive Research Grants.

References

External links

20th-century births
Living people
Australian computer scientists
Australian women computer scientists
La Trobe University alumni
Academic staff of Curtin University
Fellow Members of the IEEE
Year of birth missing (living people)
Place of birth missing (living people)